Wolfgang Heisig (born in 1952) is a German pianist and composer who is known for his contemporary application of piano rolls.

Life and career 
Born in Zwickau, Heisig studied piano and composition at the Hochschule für Musik Carl Maria von Weber in Dresden between 1972 and 1978. Since 1980 he has composed short aphoristic piano pieces, which form the collection Klaviertöne. Furthermore, he was involved in the composition of the film music for the feature film .

Since 1990, Heisig has been intensively engaged with the music of the composer Conlon Nancarrow, who often punched his compositions into paper rolls that were played with player pianos. He also had a PC-controlled punching machine built to produce and perform Nancarrow's compositions on a music roll. In the meantime, this has resulted in the world's only music roll edition of Nancarrow's works.

Heisig also duplicates his own compositions with the roll technique. In his concerts he interprets Nancarrow as well as his own and other contemporary works. With Michael Wollny, Émile Parisien,  and Leafcutter John, he played at the ceremony "100 Years Bauhaus" at the Academy of Arts, Berlin.

Compositions 
 Sprachfachübungen.
 Phonola.
 Methodenenwicklungen zur Identitätsprüfung pflanzlicher Drogen : mit weiterführenden Untersuchungen an den Infloreszenzen von 'Calendula officinalis' L.
 Mars saugt Mut : for phonola and sampler.
 List of 13 Compositions in the German National Library.

References

External links 
 
 Webpräsenz
 

1952 births
Living people
People from Zwickau
German classical pianists
Male classical pianists
20th-century classical composers
German film score composers
20th-century German male musicians